The 1977 FA Cup final was the final match of the 1976–77 FA Cup, the 96th season of England's premier cup football competition. The match was played on 21 May 1977 at Wembley Stadium, London, and it was contested by Manchester United and Liverpool. United won the game 2–1. All three goals came in a five-minute period early in the second half. Stuart Pearson opened the scoring when he latched onto a long ball forward and drove a hard shot past Ray Clemence. Liverpool equalised through Jimmy Case soon after, as he turned and hooked a right foot half-volley into the top corner, giving Stepney no chance. However, just three minutes later, United regained the lead when Lou Macari's shot deflected off teammate Jimmy Greenhoff's chest and looped into the net past Clemence and Phil Neal on the line. Jimmy Greenhoff's brother Brian was also in the United line-up, making them the first pair of brothers to play in a winning FA Cup final team since George and Ted Robledo played for Newcastle United in 1952.

Liverpool had already won the league title, which meant Manchester United qualified for the 1977–78 European Cup Winners' Cup regardless of the result. Liverpool then won the European Cup four days later, so United's victory prevented them from becoming the first club to win the continental treble of League, FA Cup, and European Cup titles – United would instead achieve this feat 22 years later.

Match details

References

External links
LFC History Match Report 

FA Cup Finals
Final
Fa Cup Final 1977
Fa Cup Final 1977
FA Cup Final
FA Cup Final